The British Women Racing Drivers Club (BWRDC) is a membership body which represents the interests of professional women racing drivers from the United Kingdom. The BWRDC celebrated their 50th anniversary in 2012. It holds its own awards and championships based on its members performances. The awards are given at an annual ceremony. 

The BWRDC was founded in 1962 by Mary Wheeler, with 30 members. Women were not allowed to join the British Racing Drivers' Club until 1992. In 2012 the BWRDC had 160 members.

References

External links
Official site
BWRDC on Twitter

Motorsport organisations in the United Kingdom
Professional associations based in the United Kingdom
Women's sports organisations in the United Kingdom
1962 establishments in the United Kingdom
Organizations established in 1962